José Espinoza  (born 15 June 1988, San José de Rio Chico, Miranda) is a Venezuelan boxer who competes as a middleweight.  At the 2012 Summer Olympics he was defeated in the heats of the men's middleweight by Zoltán Harcsa.

References

Living people
Olympic boxers of Venezuela
Boxers at the 2012 Summer Olympics
Middleweight boxers
Venezuelan male boxers

1988 births
People from Miranda (state)